Lemuel Ertus Slack, (October 8, 1874 – February 24, 1952) often called L. Ert Slack, was an American politician and lawyer who served as the 29th Mayor of Indianapolis, Indiana.

Biography
Lemuel Ertus Slack was born in Nineveh Township, Johnson County, Indiana, on October 8, 1874, to Elisha O. Slack and Nancy A. Teeters, who were of Scotch-Irish ancestry. He had three sisters: Mary, Maude, and Jessie, and one brother, Henry, who died at the age of twelve years old. He attended school in Hensley Township, and had a reputation as a diligent student. He worked in a blacksmith shop during vacations.

From 1892, at the age of 17, he was employed in the Central Hospital for Insane in Indianapolis, where he remained until 1896. He began studying law on his own, and in October 1896, he entered the Indiana Law School as a senior, graduating after only a year in 1987. He was admitted to the bar in Franklin, Indiana, on September 6, 1897, and was appointed Deputy Prosecutor on the day of admission. On September 1, 1897, he formed a partnership with William E. Deupree under the firm name of Deupree & Slack, which lasted until November 1906.

On October 31, 1897, Slack married Mayme Shields of Columbus, Indiana. They had one child, who died in infancy. Slack was a member of the Modern Woodmen of America, Camp 2640; the Independent Order of Odd Fellows, Johnson Lodge 76; and the Knights of Pythias Lodge at Franklin. He was also affiliated with Masonic orders: Franklin Lodge 107; Franklin Chapter No 65 of the Royal Arch Masons; Franklin Commandery No 23 of the Knights Templar; Indianapolis Consistory, 32nd degree, of the Scottish Rite; and Murat Temple of the Nobles of the Mystic Shrine. Religiously, he was a member, with his wife, of the Christian Science church at Franklin.

He was a member of the Indiana House of Representatives from 1901 to 1903, a member of the Indiana Senate from 1905 to 1907, and was a candidate for Governor of Indiana in 1908. He was appointed United States Attorney for Indiana from 1916 to 1920 and was Indiana's first district attorney to try violators of the federal Volstead act. Some of the more notable cases he prosecuted were the Muncie, Indiana, fake fight fraud conspiracy case of 1919, and the Evansville, Indiana, liquor conspiracy case of 1920. At the expiration of his term in 1920, Slack return to the private practice of law.

In 1927, he became the mayor of Indianapolis after John L. Duvall had been forced to resign when his involvement with the Ku Klux Klan was exposed, a position which Slack held until 1929. He was a Superior Court judge in Indiana from 1936 to 1938.

He died on February 24, 1952, in the Masonic Home in Franklin, Indiana, where he had lived in retirement for five years. He was buried at Greenlawn Cemetery in Franklin.

Notes

References

1874 births
1952 deaths
Democratic Party Indiana state senators
Democratic Party members of the Indiana House of Representatives
Mayors of Indianapolis
Indiana lawyers
United States Attorneys for the District of Indiana
People from Franklin, Indiana
20th-century American politicians